Pleuronaia dolabelloides, the slab-sided naiad, slab-sided pearly mussel, or slabside pearlymussel, is a species of freshwater mussel, an aquatic bivalve mollusk in the family Unionidae, the river mussels. This species was formerly classified under the genus Lexingtonia. 

This species is endemic to the Tennessee River system in the United States.

References

Molluscs of the United States
dolabelloides
Bivalves described in 1840
ESA endangered species